was the 6th daimyō of Odawara Domain in Sagami Province (modern-day Kanagawa Prefecture) in mid-Edo period Japan. His courtesy title was Kaga no Kami.

Biography
Ōkubo Tadaaki was the eldest son of Ōkubo Tadayoshi, the 5th daimyō of Odawara Domain. During his tenure, Odawara suffered from repeated natural disasters, including the earthquakes and fires which destroyed Odawara Castle and much of the surrounding Odawara-juku. Inclement weather led to crop failures, including the Great Tenmei Famine, which severely curtailed traffic on the Tōkaidō highway connecting Edo with Kyoto. As one of the major post stations  on the Tōkaidō, this created an economic crisis for the town residents. Although Tadaaki responded with the usual restrictions on spending in an effort to economize of the domain's tax revenues, his efforts were undermined by rampant inflation, and demands from the Tokugawa shogunate to strength coastal defenses against possible incursions of foreign vessels. He retired from public life in 1796 with these issues unresolved and died in 1803.

Takaaki was married to a daughter of Nakagawa Hisasada, daimyō of Oka Domain in Bungo Province.

References 
 Papinot, Edmond. (1906) Dictionnaire d'histoire et de géographie du japon. Tokyo: Librarie Sansaisha...Click link for digitized 1906 Nobiliaire du japon (2003)
 The content of much of this article was derived from that of the corresponding article on Japanese Wikipedia.

Fudai daimyo
Tadaaki
1760 births
1803 deaths